Bolsøy is a former municipality in Møre og Romsdal county, Norway.  The  municipality of Bolsøy encompassed the area around the Fannefjorden including most of the present-day Molde Municipality, excluding the town of Molde. The municipality also included the Molde Archipelago and the island of Bolsøya. The administrative center of the municipality was located on the island of Bolsøya near the location of the main church for the parish, Bolsøy Church.

History
The parish of Bolsøy was established as a municipality on 1 January 1838 (see formannskapsdistrikt law). According to the 1835 census, Bolsøy had a population of 2,391.  On 1 January 1877, the Sotnakken farm (population: 19) was added to Bolsøy Municipality from Nesset Municipality. In 1915, a part of Bolsøy with 183 inhabitants was transferred to the town of Molde. Again in 1952, another part of Bolsøy (population: 1,913) was transferred to the town of Molde.

During the 1960s, there were many municipal mergers across Norway due to the work of the Schei Committee. On 1 January 1964, Bolsøy Municipality (population: 7,996) ceased to exist when it was merged with the town of Molde (population: 8,239), the northern part of Veøy Municipality (population: 756), and the Mordal area (population: 77) from Nord-Aukra Municipality to form the new Molde Municipality.

Government

The municipal council  of Bolsøy was made up of 35 representatives that were elected to four year terms.  The party breakdown of the final municipal council was as follows:

See also
List of former municipalities of Norway

References

Molde
Former municipalities of Norway
1838 establishments in Norway
1964 disestablishments in Norway